Anar Nagilbaz (28 March 1976 Khirdalan – 4 August 2018 Baku), born Anar Jabiyev, was an Azerbaijani rapper, songwriter and actor. He is often considered the "Father of Azerbaijani rap" after he composed the first rap album in Azerbaijani.

Albums
 Sabah Olmayacaq (1997)
 Keçdi Günlər (1999)
 O Qızı Görən Olubmu? (2000)
 Zaman O Zaman Deyil (2001)
 Dost (2003)
 İç Xəbər (2005)
 Göbələk (2005)
 Non-Stop (2007)

References

1974 births
2018 deaths
21st-century Azerbaijani male singers
Musicians from Baku
Male rappers
Azerbaijani rappers
20th-century Azerbaijani male singers